[FLA]vour of the Weak is the ninth full-length studio album by industrial music group Front Line Assembly, released in November 1997 by Off Beat.

Background
[FLA]vour of the Weak is the first album of the band to feature Chris Peterson. Peterson had already toured with Front Line Assembly for Caustic Grip and Tactical Neural Implant but had never been part of the creative process. He also had teamed up with Rhys Fulber in the band Will before Fulber became official member of Front Line Assembly. After Fulber's departure, band leader Bill Leeb asked Peterson to join Front Line Assembly.

Musical style
The style is somewhat of a departure from previous releases in the FLA catalog, with the group's beat-heavy signature beginning to take heavy cues from styles such as IDM and breakbeat.

Samples
"Sado-Masochist" uses samples of Eazy-E from an interview with hip hop group N.W.A while both "Comatose" and "Predator" as well as the B-side "Oblivion" contain samples from 1996 American horror film Hellraiser: Bloodline. Non-album track "Electrocution" from the Colombian Necktie single makes use of samples from Daft Punk's "Rollin' & Scratchin'" and from The Chemical Brothers' "Block Rockin' Beats".

Release
In 2015, the album saw a limited re-release on vinyl through Canadian label Artoffact.

Singles
[FLA]vour of the Weak spawned two singles. The "Colombian Necktie" single contains an edit as well as a remix by Tim Schuldt of the title track. It also features two non-album tracks, "Deadlock" and "Electrocution".

The second single, "Comatose", contains the "Ketamin 45mg" and "Valium 15mg" mixes by the band themselves. A third version of the title track ("Prozac 75mg") was remixed by Eat Static, who would deliver another, drastically different, remix of "Comatose" on Re-Wind. The single also contains an exclusive mix of "Oblivion".

Most of the tracks from the singles were re-released in 1999 through Off Beat on the compilation album Explosion together with tracks from the "Circuitry" and "Plasticity" singles. This coincided with the release of Implode and the timing of the compilation's release displeased Bill Leeb.

Track listing

Personnel

Front Line Assembly
 Bill Leeb – production, mixing, vocals
 Chris Peterson – production, mixing

Technical personnel
 Adam Drake – editing
 Dave McKean – design, illustration, photography
 Jamie Griffiths – band photography
 Tom Baker – mastering

Chart positions

Comatose

References

Front Line Assembly albums
1997 albums
Albums with cover art by Dave McKean
Metropolis Records albums
Albums produced by Chris Peterson (producer)